Dactylopusiidae is a family of copepods belonging to the order Harpacticoida.

Genera:
 Dactylopodopsis Sars, 1911
 Dactylopusia Norman, 1903
 Dactylopusioides Brian, 1928
 Diarthrodes Thomson, 1883
 Paradactylopodia Lang, 1944
 Sewelliapusia Huys, 2009

References

Copepods